is a former Japanese free announcer and tarento. She was represented with Cent Force.

Biography
Ito was born in Osaka Prefecture as the second of three daughters. Her hobbies are walking dogs, watching films and yoga, and her skill is swimming in which her body is soft.

Ito majored in Japanese literature at Kinki University Faculty of Letters and Arts. In 2013 at the same university, she was selected as Miss Kinki University 2013, and participated in the Miss Campus Queen Contest (entry No. 2). Ito was also chosen at the semi-Grand Prix. In 2014 she also appeared on the Sankei Sports gourmet project Ekichō Osusume Gourmet "Eki Oshi!"

After graduating from the university in July 2016, Ito launched full-fledged activities as a tarento first stage student belonging to a newly launched regional base "Cent Force Kansai" from Cent Force. In August that year, she decorated the cover and top gravure with Weekly Playboy'''s issue 36. Ito is currently living in Osaka while conducting tarento'' activities.

Programme appearances

Magazine

References

External links
 – Official profile 
 – Official blog 
 (December 2013) 
Saisai Kenbi –Campus Bijo no Interview Snap- "Risako Ito" 

Japanese announcers
Japanese television personalities
People from Osaka Prefecture
1994 births
Living people